The Bob Crane Show is an American sitcom that aired on NBC. The series starred Bob Crane as Bob Wilcox, a man in his 40s who quits his job as an insurance salesman to return to medical school. The series co-starred Patricia Harty as his wife Ellie Wilcox, who becomes the family's breadwinner while Bob is in school. After initial delays, the series debuted on March 6, 1975. The Bob Crane Show performed poorly in the Nielsen ratings and was canceled after 13 weeks.

Production
The Bob Crane Show was originally titled Second Start and NBC planned to debut it in the fall of 1974. However, the Federal Communications Commission re-instituted its Prime Time Access Rule, which limited the broadcast networks to programming only three of the four hours of the prime time programming block. This decision led NBC to delay the series until January 1975. Crane re-shot the pilot, leading to another delay to March 1975.

Crane expressed his desire that his series be what he called "hard comedy", which he described as comedy that "goes for the fences. It's also what you might call take-a-risk comedy because if you don't hit a home run, you might strike out. It's either a belly laugh or it's no go and no show."

MTM Enterprises produced the series, which was filmed with a three-camera setup in front of a studio audience with a sweetened laugh track.

Cast
 Bob Crane as Bob Wilcox
 Patricia Harty as Ellie Wilcox
 James Sutorius as Jerry Mallory 
 Todd Susman as Marvin Susman
 Erica Petal as Pam Wilcox 
 Jack Fletcher as Dean Lyle Ingersoll
 Ronny Graham as Ernest Busso

Episodes

Reception
The Bob Crane Show finished the season in 65th place with a 14.9 Nielsen rating, a disappointment to the network. NBC cancelled the series after 13 weeks.

Series star Crane blamed the failure on the lack of chemistry among the characters. He compared The Bob Crane Show to its fellow series, The Mary Tyler Moore Show and The Bob Newhart Show, in wishing that the same sorts of character relationships on those series had been present in his. "I had nobody to talk to....In my series, I had no Bill Daily."

Notes

References
 Alwood, Edward (1996). Straight News. New York, Columbia University Press. .
 Tropiano, Stephen (2002). The Prime Time Closet: A History of Gays and Lesbians on TV. Hal Leonard Corporation. .

External links
 

1975 American television series debuts
1975 American television series endings
1970s American sitcoms
NBC original programming
English-language television shows
Television series by MTM Enterprises
1970s American medical television series
1970s American college television series
1970s American workplace comedy television series
Television shows set in Los Angeles